Ki Dar-e Bala (also Romanized as Kī Dar-e Bālā; also known as Kī Dar and Kīdar) is a village in Piveshk Rural District, Lirdaf District, Jask County, Hormozgan Province, Iran. At the 2006 census, its population was 216, in 54 families.

References 

Populated places in Jask County